Avenir Peka (born 17 February 1978) is the current deputy Minister of Interior Affairs

External links
Avenir Peka CV

References

Living people
Democratic Party of Albania politicians
1978 births
Politicians from Tirana
University of Tirana alumni